Isla de la Plata is a small island off the coast of Manabí, Ecuador, and is part of Parque Nacional Machalilla. It can be reached by boat from the city of Puerto López, which is 40 kilometers away.
On the island, there is a large diversity of animal species, including the blue-footed booby, red-footed booby, and the Nazca booby. Another species found here is the South American sea lion. 

Guided tours of the island are given on a couple of different hiking trails. 

There is a shrine from Inca times located on the island.

In popular culture
Isla de la Plata is featured in an episode of the travel series Jet Set Zero.

Gallery

References

Pacific islands of Ecuador
Beaches of Ecuador
Geography of Manabí Province
Tourist attractions in Manabí Province

External links
 Isla de la Plata, Ecuador (in Spanish)